Local elections were held in Makati on May 13, 2019, within the Philippine general election. The voters will elect for the elective local posts in the city: the mayor, vice mayor, the two Congressmen, and the eight councilors, eight in each of the city's two legislative districts.

Background
Incumbent mayor Abigail Binay assumed as Mayor after winning in the 2016 elections. Binay ran after the Office of the Ombudsman dismissed her brother former Mayor Junjun Binay due to the alleged overpricing of Makati City Hall Building II. She is running for reelection under the United Nationalist Alliance. Her main opponent is her brother, Junjun. The former mayor claims that she has a deal with her sister, that  she  will serve for one term as Mayor. The Ombudsman dismissed Binay due to the Makati City Hall Building II parking lot fiasco and was perpetually disqualified from holding any public office. However, the  Commission on Elections reiterates that Binay can still run for Mayor, because the ruling is not yet final and executory. The former mayor has the support of majority of councilors and  Barangay Captains in Makati. In an interview on 24 Oras, he will withdraw his candidacy for Mayor if his father, former Vice President Jejomar Binay will run for Mayor.

Candidates

Representative

1st District
Incumbent Monsour del Rosario is running for Vice Mayor. His party nominated former Vice President Jejomar Binay, who is running against, among others, former acting city mayor Romulo “Kid” Peña.

2nd District
Incumbent Luis Campos is running for reelection. His opponents are city councilor Nemesio "King" Yabut Jr., Rodolfo Flores and Ricardo Opoc.

Mayor

Vice Mayor

Councilors

1st District

|-bgcolor=black
|colspan=25|

Notes
 A^ Incumbent Rico J. Puno died on October 30, 2018. His daughter, former councilor Tosca Camille Puno-Ramos, was named as his substitute.

2nd District

|-bgcolor=black
|colspan=17|

References

2019 Philippine local elections
Elections in Makati
May 2019 events in the Philippines
2019 elections in Metro Manila